The Secret of the Blue Room is a 1933 American pre-Code mystery film directed by Kurt Neumann and starring Lionel Atwill, Gloria Stuart, Paul Lukas and Edward Arnold. The film's plot concerns a group of wealthy people who stay at a European mansion that features a blue room that is said to be cursed, as everyone who has stayed there has died shortly after. Three people suggest a wager that each can survive a night in the blue room.

The Secret of the Blue Room is based on the German film Geheimnis des blauen Zimmers and was Universal Studios' least expensive feature of 1933. Universal later remade the film as The Missing Guest (1938) and Murder in the Blue Room (1944).

Plot
A woman's suitor named Tommy challenges his two rivals to each spend a night in a blue room in which several murders had occurred years before at 1 a.m. Tommy sleeps there on the first night but disappears at 1 a.m. The second man sleeps there the next night. At 12:30 a.m, he starts playing the piano, but is shot half an hour later.

As these events occur, a police investigation leads to several answers to several mysteries. On the fifth night, the third man sleeps in the blue room. However, he places a dummy in an armchair and conceals himself behind a coat. At 1 a.m, a revolver reaches around the door and fires at the dummy. The man and several police officers jump out of their hiding places. After a furious gunfight, the villain is apprehended and discovered to be Tommy.

Cast

Style
The authors of the book Universal Horror describe The Secret of the Blue Room as an "engaging example of the early 'spooky house' mystery" and observe that it "had all the recognizable elements of the classic Universal horror films ... for all the atmosphere the picture unmistakably remains a whodunit at heart."

Production
The Secret of the Blue Room was produced on a budget of $69,000, making it the cheapest Universal Studios production of 1933. The film was a remake of the 1932 German mystery film Geheimnis des blauen Zimmers. According to The Hollywood Reporter, Lillian Bond was cast as Betty but was replaced by Muriel Kirkland.

Release
The Secret of the Blue Room was released in the United States on July 20, 1933. Universal later remade the film as The Missing Guest (1938) and Murder in the Blue Room (1944). The film was released on DVD on October 16, 2014 as part of the Universal Vault Series.

Reception

In a contemporary review, Richard Watts Jr. of the New York Herald Tribune found that despite being a bit too formulaic, the film was "better than a number of previous efforts of its school" but contained a "grand cast." Mordaunt Hall of The New York Times compared the film to The Old Dark House, stating that the film "lopes along in quite an interesting fashion until it comes to the denouement, which is by no means as satisfactory as might be anticipated." Wanda Hale of The New York Daily News stated that the story was "too unreasonable for words." A review in The Film Weekly observed that the performances by Paul Lukas, Gloria Stuart and Lionel Atwill were "worthy of a stronger and less threadbare story."

Tom Weaver, Michael Brunas and John Brunas commented in their book Universal Horror that "most of the early Universal mysteries that masquerade as horror films are fairly dismal" but declared this film as "a minor gem ... probably one of the best of Universal's non-horror horror films." Hans J. Wollstein of AllMovie awards the film a three-star rating, noting that it made "good utilization of standing sets, including the mansion from James Whale's far superior The Old Dark House (1932), adds production values not matched by its Poverty Row competitors, of which there were many."

References

Footnotes

Sources

External links

1933 films
1933 mystery films
American mystery films
American black-and-white films
Films directed by Kurt Neumann
American remakes of German films
Films set in Germany
Universal Pictures films
1930s American films